XHRD-FM 104.5/XERD-AM 1240 is a combo radio station in Pachuca, Hidalgo in Mexico. It is owned by Grupo ACIR and carries its La Comadre grupera format.

History
XERD received its first concession on October 4, 1945 as XEPK-AM, initially on 1420. The station came to air on December 1 of that year as the first radio station in Hidalgo; Governor Vicente Aguirre del Castillo was present at its inauguration. It was owned by Red Central Radiofónica. Soon after, XEPK moved down the dial to 1190 and became a daytimer. In the 1980s, its callsign became XEFIE-AM and gave birth to an FM station XHFIE-FM 104.5.

In the mid-1990s, XEPK became XERD-AM 1240 and XHRD-FM 104.5 as part of a callsign swap with the original XERD at 1420, now sister station XHPK-FM 92.5.

References

Radio stations established in 1945
Radio stations in Hidalgo (state)
Grupo ACIR